"Ain't No Limit" is the first single from Mystikal's second studio album titled Unpredictable. It features fellow No Limit rapper, Silkk The Shocker. The song was minor success peaking at #63 on the Hot R&B/Hip-Hop Singles & Tracks.

Chart positions

References

External links
 "Ain't No Limit" & The Man Right Chea Music Videos

1997 singles
Silkk the Shocker songs
Mystikal songs
1997 songs
Jive Records singles